Ich suche Dich ("I Seek You" ) is a 1956 German film based on the 1940 play Jupiter Laughs by A. J. Cronin. It is directed by O. W. Fischer, who also stars in the film, and also features Anouk Aimée, Nadja Tiller, and Otto Brüggemann. Seeleiten Castle in Murnau, Bavaria serves as one of the filming locations.

Cast
O. W. Fischer as Dr. Paul Venner
Anouk Aimée as Francoise Maurer
Nadja Tiller as Gaby Brugg
Otto Brüggeman as Dr. Brugg
Paul Bildt as Dr. Drews
Peter-Timm Schaufuß as Dr. Durchgutt
Hilde Wagener as Senior Nurse Fanny
Robert Meyn as Appel
Ursula Herion as Jenny
Anton Tiller as Baron Greiler
Eva Klein-Donath as Frau Konsulin
Hermann Erhardt as Patient Forster
Franziska Liebing as Frau Forster
Harriet Geßner as Nurse Anna

See also
Shining Victory (1941)

Awards
At the 1957 San Sebastián International Film Festival, O.W. Fischer was the recipient of  the Silver Seashell and the OCIC Award.

External links 

1956 films
1956 drama films
German drama films
West German films
German films based on plays
Medical-themed films
1950s German-language films
German black-and-white films
Films based on works by A. J. Cronin
Films directed by O. W. Fischer
Remakes of American films
1950s German films